COVID-19 vaccination in Japan started later than in most other major economies. The country has frequently been regarded as "slow" in its vaccination efforts.

Japan has so far approved Pfizer–BioNTech, Moderna and Oxford–AstraZeneca for use. In early October 2021, data from the government shows that 60.9% of people have had their second dose, while 71.3% have received first shot. Today, 79 percent of Japanese people have received two doses of a COVID-19 vaccine; 20 percent have received a third (booster) dose.

Background 
On 14 February 2021, Pfizer was approved by the government of Japan, and was deployed on 17 February 2021. On 28 May 2021, Pfizer was approved by the Japanese health ministry panel for adolescents aged between 12 and 15 years.

On 21 May 2021, Moderna and Astrazeneca were approved by the government of Japan.

Vaccines on order

Note: Japan has donated 1.24 million doses of AstraZeneca vaccine to Taiwan and 1 million doses to Vietnam. There are plans to send additional 2 million doses to these countries. Japan has also donated 1 million doses each to Thailand, Malaysia, Indonesia and the Philippines. Japan also donates over 2 million doses of AstraZeneca Vaccine to Iran through COVAX.

Vaccines in trial stage

History

In April 2021, prime minister Suga Yoshihide announced that Japan will receive 50 million doses of the Pfizer vaccine after a meeting with the company's CEO.

The roll out of the vaccines in Japan, with 4 percent of the population inoculated as of May 21, 2021, has led to criticisms of slow approval, disruptions on import, and the lack of medical professionals. A poll conducted in April showed that more than 60 percent of people were dissatisfied with Japan's vaccine rollout, with experts stating that it was too late now to stop the spread of variants with vaccines.

On May 21, 2021, several municipal governments in Kanagawa Prefecture were getting rid of their Moderna vaccine stocks as the doses are near their expiry date. On June 5, 2022, around 740,000 Moderna doses will be disposed of due to being expired.

Distribution issues

2020 Summer Olympics

References

Japan
COVID-19 pandemic in Japan